Sadang-dong is a dong (neighborhood) of Dongjak-gu in Seoul, South Korea.

In a survey conducted in 2011 by the Ministry of Land, Transport and Maritime Affairs on 92 Administrative divisions across the country, it reported that the bus stops in Sadang-dong are among the busiest in the country. The name Sadang-dong derives from the fact that there was a shrine in the village. The shrine is like Guolisa Temple for Confucius, the founder of Confucianism, which is the foundation of Joseon philosophy. The location is currently near Isu intersection.

See also 
Administrative divisions of South Korea

References

External links
Map and statistics of Dongjak-gu

Neighbourhoods of Dongjak District